Adelina plana is a species of darkling beetle in the family Tenebrionidae.

References

Further reading

 

Tenebrionidae
Articles created by Qbugbot
Beetles described in 1801